Blackpool was a parliamentary constituency centred on the town of Blackpool in Lancashire.  It returned one Member of Parliament (MP)  to the House of Commons of the Parliament of the United Kingdom.

The constituency was created for the 1885 general election, and abolished for the 1945 general election, when it was replaced by the new Blackpool North and Blackpool South constituencies.

Boundaries
1885–1918: The Municipal Borough of Preston, the Sessional Divisions of Amounderness and Kirkham, and part of the Sessional Division of Leyland.

1918–1945: The County Borough of Blackpool, the Urban Districts of Bispham with Norbreck, Lytham, and St Anne's-on-Sea, and part of the parish of Carleton.

Members of Parliament

Election results

Elections in the 1880s 

Stanley was appointed President of the Board of Trade and elevated to the peerage, becoming Lord Stanley of Preston, requiring a by-election.

Elections in the 1890s

Elections in the 1900s

Elections in the 1910s 

General Election 1914–15:

Another General Election was required to take place before the end of 1915. The political parties had been making preparations for an election to take place and by the July 1914, the following candidates had been selected; 
Unionist: Wilfrid Ashley
Liberal: 

 supported Coalition Government and received local Liberal Party support.

Elections in the 1920s

Elections in the 1930s 

 Wallace was opposed to the National Government

Elections in the 1940s 
General Election 1939–40:
Another General Election was required to take place before the end of 1940. The political parties had been making preparations for an election to take place from 1939 and by the end of this year, the following candidates had been selected; 
Conservative: Roland Robinson
Liberal: Adrian Liddell Hart
Labour: Harvey Thorneycroft

References 

Craig, F. W. S. (1983). British parliamentary election results 1918-1949 (3 ed.). Chichester: Parliamentary Research Services. .

Parliamentary constituencies in North West England (historic)
Constituencies of the Parliament of the United Kingdom established in 1885
Constituencies of the Parliament of the United Kingdom disestablished in 1945
History of Blackpool